Chhote Rahimat Khan (born 1959), is a Hindustani classical sitar player of the Bande Ali Khan (beenkar) Gharana, taught by his father, Abdul Karim Khan, and grandfather, Ratna Rahimat Khan, as well as his older brothers. Rahimat Khan is the elder  brother of Ustad Bale Khan and a young  twin brother, Ustad Shafique Khan, Rafique Khan also a sitarist.

Belonging to the seventh generation of musicians from Dharwad, Gwalior, he received the majority of his training from his father, Ustad Abdul Karim Khan, although he has also benefited from the influence of his legendary grandfather, Sitar Ratna Rahimat Khan (born 1863). Ratna Rahimat Khan, a disciple of the great master, Ustad Bande Ali Khan, was a rudra vina and sitar player who was responsible not only for modifying the three-string sitar to the seven-string instrument that we have today, but also for reunifying the instrumental khyal of the Gwalior gharana with the instrumental dhrupad of Gwalior. It is this inimitable legacy that gives his music a unique and distinctive colour, rarely experienced in modern music circles. His music is a sonorous blend of both Gayaki Ang, which aims to imitate the tonal nuance of the human voice on the instrument, and Tantakari Ang, the more traditional instrumental style played on the instrument.

Recognition and achievements 

He secured second prize in the All India Radio Music Competition held in Dharwad in 1978, at the age of 19, and also won the first award in the preliminary and final round of the Yuva Sangeet Nrithya Mahotsav organized by the South Central Zone Cultural Centre at Nagpur on 6 October 1987. He is a regular artist on AIR Dharwad and AIR Panaji, Goa.

Music direction 

He is also a music director. He scored music to Vadhachakra, the first Marathi film of Goa, in 1992, and also to Tulsi, a Konkani Tele Film, in 1994. He has also scored live music for one of Kālidāsa’s plays, Abhidnyan Shakuntal, staged by Prof. Kamalakar Sonatakke, on 16 and 17 December 2005.

Current position 

Ustad Chhote Rahimat Khan has been the Head of the Sitar Faculty at Kala Academy in Goa for several years now, and has also given public performances in numerous festivals in Asia and in Europe. Besides many concerts in India, he has performed in the UK, Portugal, China, France, Finland, Malaysia and Singapore.
He is a recognised 'Top' graded artist of the All India Radio.

References

External links 

 Official Website 
 Other Website 

1959 births
Living people
Sitar players
Recipients of the Rajyotsava Award 2019